Elinchrom LTD is a Swiss company manufacturing flash equipment and light shaping tools for professional photographers. The company was founded in 1962 in Renens, Switzerland.

Range

Elinchrom produces compact flash heads, battery packs, continuous light accessories, remote controls, light shapers and other accessories.

Compacts flash heads

Recently, Elinchrom moved their tooling for the Compact entry-level lights to India where they are now producing the D-Lite RX series. The professional compact series, the ELC Pro HD is manufactured in Switzerland.

 Ranger Quadra AS, RX, RX Speed, RX Speed AS

Remote controllers
Remote controllers include:
 EL Skyport Wireless

Continuous lighting

The continuous lighting uses tungsten bulbs with a colour temperature of around 3200 K instead of daylight-balanced (5500 K) flash tubes. All units accept the same range of light modifiers as the flash units, subject to the additional heat generated by the bulbs. The Scanlite range employs halogen bulbs.

Lighting modifiers

Elinchrom supplies a range of lighting modifiers as accessories for their lights. Some accessories (such as umbrellas) attach to the light unit by means of a pole passing through a 7 mm hole through the head, and others (such as softboxes, reflector dishes and snoots) attach using Elinchrom's bayonet system.

Notes

References
 http://www.ephotozine.com/article/Three-products-to-be-launched-by-Elinchrom-10325
 http://www.prophotonut.com/2011/08/24/elinchrom-quadra-lighting-kit-first-time-out-pictures-and-behind-the-scenes/

External links
 Elinchrom web site

Photography companies of Switzerland
Photographic lighting
Electronics companies established in 1962
Swiss companies established in 1962